The city of Kinshasa has had a different status under each of the different regimes in the Democratic Republic of the Congo. Kinshasa was alternatively a commune, a city, a region, and a city-province hybrid. Consequently, the political leaders of the city have born different titles between 1960 and this day.

Bourgmestre of Léopoldville
 Daniel Kanza (1960–1962)
 Zoao Boniface (1963–1965)

Governor of Léopoldville (1966–1968)
 Colonel Bangala
 Paul Nauwelaerts

Governor of the Kinshasa region (1969–1980)
 Jean Foster Manzikala
 Ndjoku E'Yobaba
 Sakombi Inongo
 Mandungu Mbula Nyati
 Mabolia Inengo Tra Buato

Regional President of the MPR for the Kinshasa Region
 Kisombe Kiaku Mwisi (1980–1981)
 Sakombi Ekope (1981–1983)
 Kabaydi wa Kabaydi (1983–1985)
 Nzita Puati interim (1984–1985)
 Tshimbombo Mukunda (1985–1986)
 Catherine Nzuzi wa Mbombo (1986)
 Konde Vila Kikanda (1987–1989)
 General Gabriel Amela Lokima Bahati (1989–1990)
 Moleka Nzulama (1990)

Governor of Kinshasa
 Fundu Kota (1991–1992)
 Kibabu Madiata Nzau (1992)
 Bernardin Mungul Diaka (1992—1996)
 Mujinga Swana (January—February 1996)
 Nkoy Mafuta (August 1996—May 1997)
 General Gabriel Amela Lokima Bahati (April—May 1997)
 Théophile Mbemba Fundu (1997—2001)
 Christophe Muzungu (May 2001—November 26, 2001)
  (November 26, 2001—June 5, 2002)
 David Nku Imbié (June 2002—May 16, 2004)
 Jean Kimbunda (May 16, 2004—November 15, 2005)
 Kimbembe Mazunga (November 15, 2005—October 16, 2006)
 Admiral Baudoin Liwanga (October 16, 2006 —March 16, 2007)
 André Kimbuta)  (March 16, 2007—2019)
 Gentiny Ngobila Mbaka (May 7, 2019– )

See also 

 Kinshasa
 Kinshasa history and timeline
 Lists of provincial governors of the Democratic Republic of the Congo

References

External links
 Congo (Kinshasa) provinces Congo (Kinshasa) provinces], List of provincial leaders

Governors, Kinshasa
Main
Governors of provinces of the Democratic Republic of the Congo